Nathanson is a surname. It may refer to:

Bernard Nathanson (1926–2011), American physician
E. M. Nathanson (1928–2016), American writer
Jacob P. Nathanson (1901–1986), New York politician
Jeff Nathanson (born 1965), American screenwriter
Marcus Nathanson (1793–1868), Jewish scholar
Matt Nathanson (born 1973), American singer and songwriter
Melvyn B. Nathanson (born 1944), American mathematician  
Michael Nathanson (actor), American actor
Michael Nathanson (director), Canadian playwright and theatre director
Michael Nathanson (film executive), American film industry executive
Rikki Nathanson (born ), Zimbabwean transgender activist
Ted Nathanson (1925–1997), American television director

See also
 Natanson